The 12th CARIFTA Games was held in Fort-de-France, Martinique on April 2–4, 1983.

Participation (unofficial)

For the 1983 CARIFTA Games only the medalists can be found on the "World Junior Athletics History" website.  An unofficial count yields the number of about 108 medalists (63 junior (under-20) and 45 youth (under-17)) from about 13 countries:  Antigua and Barbuda (3), Bahamas (26), Barbados (9), Bermuda (5), Cayman Islands (1), Grenada (4), Guadeloupe (10), Jamaica (25), Martinique (11), Saint Kitts and Nevis (1), Saint Vincent and the Grenadines (2), Trinidad and Tobago (10), US Virgin Islands (1).

Austin Sealy Award

The Austin Sealy Trophy for the most outstanding athlete of the games was awarded for the second time in the role to Laverne Eve from the Bahamas.  As in 1982, she won 3 gold medals (shot put, discus throw, and javelin throw) in the junior (U-20) category.

Medal summary

Medal winners are published by category: Boys under 20 (Junior), Girls under 20 (Junior), Boys under 17 (Youth), and Girls under 17 (Youth).
The medalists can also be found on the "World Junior Athletics History"
website.

Boys under 20 (Junior)

Girls under 20 (Junior)

Boys under 17 (Youth)

* One source states: Javelin only 600g rather than 700g.

Girls under 17 (Youth)

Medal table (unofficial)

References

External links
World Junior Athletics History

CARIFTA Games
1983 in Martinique
CARIFTA
1983 in Caribbean sport
International sports competitions hosted by Martinique
Athletics competitions in Martinique